Matti Johannes Reunamäki (born July 25, 1940 in Tampere, Finland) is a retired professional ice hockey player who played in the SM-liiga.  He played for KooVee.  He was inducted into the Finnish Hockey Hall of Fame in 1986.

External links
 
 Finnish Hockey Hall of Fame bio

1940 births
Living people
Finnish ice hockey forwards
KOOVEE players
Olympic ice hockey players of Finland
Ice hockey players at the 1964 Winter Olympics
Ice hockey players at the 1968 Winter Olympics
Ice hockey people from Tampere